Relapse Records is an American independent record label based in Upper Darby, Pennsylvania. It was founded by Matthew F. Jacobson in 1990. The label features many grindcore, death metal, metalcore and sludge metal artists.

History
The label was started by Matthew F. Jacobson in August, 1990 in his parents' basement in Aurora, Colorado.  The first two releases on the label were 7-inch singles by the bands Velcro Overdose and Face of Decline, closely followed by three death metal bands that would become among the biggest on the label, Deceased, Suffocation, and Incantation.

After this, Jacobson became acquainted with William Yurkiewicz Jr., who became his partner in the record label. Yurkiewicz had founded his own record label, which was soon to release albums from the bands General Surgery, Disrupt, Destroy, Misery, and Yurkiewicz's own band Exit-13. The two joined forces to create Relapse Records, aiming to release high-quality, professionally packaged extreme music.

In 1991, the label moved their headquarters to Millersville, Pennsylvania. In 1992, the label expanded its range with the creation of its subsidiary label called Release Entertainment, which specializes in experimental, ambient, industrial, and noise titles. With continued growth came a mail-order/wholesale operation that soon became the largest underground distribution center for all things metal in the United States . The mail-order service carried a wide array of extreme music recordings and merchandise, as well as publications from around the world.

Throughout the years Relapse has continued to grow and sign on more influential artists from a broader range of genres. In 1996, Relapse unveiled the Resound Music Resource Guide. Resound gave fans direct access to the label's roster through interviews and reviews, as well as being part mail-order catalog.

In 1998, Relapse opened a promotions office in Berlin, as well as establishing a German Distribution deal. In 2003, Relapse held a music festival - the Relapse Contamination Festival took place on January 18 and 19 at the Trocadero Theatre in Philadelphia, Pennsylvania and featured various Relapse artists.  In 2000, the label relocated to Upper Darby, outside of Philadelphia and began plans to include a physical record store . In June 2001, the label opened their first record store off of South Street in Philadelphia.

In 2010, Relapse announced that they had done a deal with intellectual property lawyer Eric Greif and Perseverance Holdings Ltd. to take over Chuck Schuldiner's catalog and the Death and Control Denied names internationally. Death's 1995 sixth studio album, Symbolic was excluded from the deal as the rights for said record remain with Roadrunner Records.

On August 5, 2011, Relapse announced a 24-week pay what you want partnership with Moshpit Tragedy Records, issuing one mp3 album from the Relapse catalog every week through Moshpit Tragedy's website.

Musical style
The label specializes in various types of heavy metal. Recently, with the increasing popularity of extreme metal, Relapse Records has ostensibly become more mainstream, with bands on their roster frequently appearing on the front cover of the magazine Kerrang! and video plays on TV music channels, along with some albums charting on the Billboard 200. The word has also been spread by the sponsorship of such festivals as the Milwaukee Metalfest.

It would be hard however to label the company as dealing in one specific style or another, as there are artists of such a wide variety on their roster, ranging from stoner rock and hardcore bands through to grindcore and death metal all the way to retro thrash metal and doom.

Although much of the music released on Relapse is from bands in various punk and metal subgenres, the label has also released records from several artists in other genres, including  math rock (Don Caballero, Dysrhythmia), shoegazing (Nothing, Cloakroom), post-punk (Publicist UK, Ceremony), space rock (Zombi), stand-up comedy (Brian Posehn) and synthwave (Survive).

The officially licensed reissues the label has also released also adds many other genres into their style.

Artists

Current artists

Former artists

See also
List of record labels

References

External links

Relapse's entire back catalogue on Bandcamp

American independent record labels
Heavy metal record labels
Hardcore record labels
Death metal record labels
Grindcore record labels
Record labels established in 1990